Champagne & Styrofoam Cups is a mixtape by American hip hop recording artist Fashawn, released on November 20, 2012. The mixtape contains 16 original tracks, with guest features by Wiz Khalifa, Taylor Gang Records artists Chevy Woods and Berner, singer Kobe, and more. Contributing producers included DJ Dahi, Jake One, Exile, Evidence, and Rahki.

Track listing

References

External links
Fashawn - "Champagne & Styrofoam Cups" on iTunes
Fashawn Official Website 
Fashawn on Twitter 
Fashawn on Instagram 

2012 mixtape albums
Albums produced by DJ Dahi
Albums produced by Evidence (musician)
Albums produced by Exile (producer)
Albums produced by Jake One